The NWA Arkansas Heavyweight Championship was a professional wrestling championship sanctioned by the National Wrestling Alliance and defended in its Arkansas territory.

Title history

See also
National Wrestling Alliance

Footnotes

References

External links
Wrestling-Titles.com

National Wrestling Alliance championships
National Wrestling Alliance state wrestling championships
Professional wrestling in Arkansas